A number of standards prevail in Australia for trailer connectors, the electrical connectors between vehicles and the trailers they tow that provide a means of control trailer lamps, and in one case, trailer brakes, and also sometimes, manufacturer-specific non-standard functions.

The Australian market generally uses its own version of the European connectors, as well as its uniquely own contacts.

The only connector used on the Australian market that is fully ISO standard conformant is the 7-pin ABS / EBS plug.

Since Australia has vehicles from both the North American market and the European market there is a mixture of 12V and 24V.

7-pin trailer connector (AS 4735) for heavy duty vehicles 

This connector is based on both SAE J560 and ISO 1185 and is providing either 12V, 7 x 40A or 24V, 7 x 20A. The voltage varies from vehicle to vehicle.

Round trailer connectors Type 1 

These connectors are based on ISO 1724 in 5-pin and 7-pin versions, but with some difference in the wiring.

Round 7-pin trailer connector Type 1 (AS 2513) 

In this pinout for an ISO 1724 connector, the position light pin is used for electric brakes (Pin 5, 58R), which means that if you connect a trailer with electric brakes to a towing vehicle wired according to ISO 1724 and turn on the position lights the trailer will be braking. Pin 2 (54G) is in the Australian wiring standard the reversing light, which is a minor problem.

Round 5-pin trailer connector Type 1 

This 5-pin connector has been superseded by the 7-pin (AS 2513), but can be found on older vehicles. Note that pins 1 and 4 are missing. Pin placement is identical to the 7-pin ISO 1724 with the absence of these pins. This means that you can connect a trailer with a 5-pin connector to a 7-pin socket or the other way around, but since the pins are wired in a different way the result may be far from what was expected.

Round trailer socket type 2

Round 7 pin trailer connector type 2

Round 6-pin trailer connector type 2

Rectangular trailer connectors Type 3 

The image of the 7 and 12 pin flat plugs are from the cable entry view (and possibly the images of the round connectors too). Please see reference [2] (VSB1 section 14) for front image. Reference [1] Narva wiring diagrams also have the diagrams cable entry view. If you want the front view images in colour see 

Some trailer manufacturers will wire non-standard features through non-standard pins. Auxiliary power, breakaway sense or hydraulic brake pump should never be wired to pin 2, even if the trailer does not feature reverse lights.

See also

 Trailer connector
 Trailer connectors in Europe
 ISO standards for trailer connectors
 Trailer connectors in North America
 Trailer connectors in military organizations

References

Automotive electrics
Trailers
DC power connectors